Charice: One for the Heart  is a 2012 Valentine's Day TV Special produced by GMA Network, which aired on February 12, 2012. The show earned a considerable 35.4 percent household audience share in Mega Manila based on the more trusted TV ratings service provider, Nielsen TV Audience Measurement.

Main singer
Charice Pempengco

Guest singers
Jay R
Mark Bautista

Setlist 
 Rocketeer
 Crazy In Love
 Telephone
 Heartbreak Survivor
 I Love You / Price Tag
 Ikaw Lamang (Jay R solo)
 No One Else Comes Close
 Just The Way You Are
 Pyramid
 Minsan Lang Kita Iibigin
 Sometimes When We Touch / Endless Love (featuring Mark Bautista)
 This I Promise You (Mark Bautista solo)
 Faithfully
 Dance With My Father
 Lighthouse
 Teach Me How To Dougie (band introduction)
 Before It Explodes
 Louder

See also
 List of programs broadcast by GMA Network

References

External links
Official Website of GMA Network
Official Website of GMA Pinoy TV

GMA Network original programming